The El Paso County Telephone Company is a small telephone company based in Colorado Springs, Colorado and owned by Qwest Corporation, a subsidiary of CenturyLink.

It was founded in 1915 as El Paso County Mutual Telephone Company. In 1975, the company changed its name to The El Paso County Telephone Company. In 1985, the company was acquired by U S WEST and eventually became a subsidiary of USW's Bell Operating Company, U S WEST Communications–formerly Mountain Bell, the dominant telephone company in the rest of Colorado. In 2000, Qwest acquired U S WEST and changed the name of USWC to Qwest Corporation; however, El Paso County Telephone remained unchanged.

In 2011, CenturyLink acquired Qwest; however, Elpasotel remains a subsidiary owned by Qwest Corporation with independent management. The company serves an 1,100 square mile area in eastern El Paso County, Colorado, as well as portions of Elbert, Lincoln, and Pueblo counties in Colorado

On June 10, 2013, El Paso County Telephone began doing business as CenturyLink.

References

Lumen Technologies
Communications in Colorado
American companies established in 1915
Telecommunications companies established in 1915
Companies based in Colorado Springs, Colorado
El Paso County, Colorado